Aune Selland Heggebø (born 29 July 2001) is a Norwegian football player who plays as a striker Brann in the Norwegian Premier League.

Club career
Heggebø was born in Bergen and played youth football with IL Bjarg and SK Brann before starting his professional career at the same club. In 2019 he had a short loan spell at Nest-Sotra in Norwegian First Division.

In the 2021 season he became the preferred choice after his teammate Daouda Bamba transferred in the summer transfer window, and his contract with SK Brann was extended to 2025 in early november 2021.

Career statistics

Club

References

Living people
2001 births
Footballers from Bergen
Norwegian footballers
Association football forwards
Norway youth international footballers
SK Brann players
Nest-Sotra Fotball players
Øygarden FK players
Eliteserien players
Norwegian First Division players